Makoto Hasegawa may refer to:
 Makoto Hasegawa (basketball)
 Makoto Hasegawa (dancer)